David "Happy" Williams (born September 17, 1946), is a US-based Trinidadian jazz double-bassist, who has been a long-time member of Cedar Walton's group. Williams has also worked with many other notable musicians, including Woody Shaw, Bobby Hutcherson, Stan Getz, Kenny Barron, Duke Jordan, Monty Alexander, Frank Morgan, Hank Jones, Charles McPherson, Larry Willis, George Cables, Abdullah Ibrahim, David "Fathead" Newman, Sonny Fortune, John Hicks, Louis Hayes, Jackie McLean, Clifford Jordan, Abbey Lincoln, Ernestine Anderson, and Kathleen Battle.

Background and career
David Larry Williams was born in Woodbrook, Port of Spain, Trinidad. His father, John "Buddy" Williams, was a bass player and one of Trinidad's best-known bandleaders of the 1940s and 1950s. David started playing music at the age of five, initially on piano, then violin and steelpan. He attended Tranquillity Boys School, Port of Spain, and at the age of 12 began playing bass in earnest. As a teenager, he played pan in the Invaders steelband. When his sister went to London on scholarship to study piano, David joined her there in 1962, studying bass for a year at the London College of Music. He recalls, "I started getting offers and gigs, I was working in nightclubs, you know, wherever I could play, pubs, it didn't matter, and I had this desire, this thing to just get out there and play."

Williams went to New York City in 1969 on what was intended to be a two-week visit but decided to stay on when he was offered work after sitting in on a gig with Grachan Moncur in place of Jimmy Garrison. Following leads from Ron Carter, Williams began working with Gap and Chuck Mangione, and then went to Washington, DC, where he became Roberta Flack's bass player for two years, also working with Donny Hathaway during that time.

Williams' first album as a leader, Soul is Free, was released in 1979; one of the compositions from it, "Out of the Sheets, Into the Streets", was used in the 1983 Eddie Murphy film Trading Places.

In 1982 Williams became a member of the Cedar Walton Trio alongside Billy Higgins (whom Williams first met around 1973), on the death of Sam Jones, for whom he had occasionally subbed. They became, in the words of Jazz Journal: "One of the most regarded trios in contemporary acoustic Jazz".

In more recent years, Williams has also written and recorded music inspired by Trinidadian steelpan and calypso, notably the "pan jazz" album Reid, Wright and be Happy (2003), alongside Ron Reid and Orville Wright.

Discography

As leader
 Soul is Free (AVI Records, 1978)
 Up Front (Timeless, 1986)
 Duo (Red, 1990) with Cedar Walton [originally released as Off Minor]
 Rhythm of the Street (Rots Records, 2000)
 Ping Pong Obsession (Rots Records, 2001)
 The Prize (Rots Records, 2002)
 The Spirit (Rots Records, 2003)
 Reid, Wright and Be Happy (Sanch, 2003)
 The Message (Rots Records, 2004)
 Move Your Furniture (Rots Records, 2004)
 The Licentious Hour (Rots Records, 2005)
 Feel the Passion (featuring Frankie McIntosh; 2010)

As sideman
With Herb Alpert and Hugh Masekela
Main Event Live (A & M, 1978)
With Kenny Barron
Peruvian Blue (Muse, 1974)
Invitation (Criss Cross Jazz, 1991)
Quickstep (Enja, 1991)
With David Benoit
Heavier Than Yesterday (AVI, 1977)
With The Blackbyrds
The Blackbyrds (Fantasy, 1973)
With George Cables
Old Wine New Bottles (Atlas, 1982)
Wonderful L. A. (Atlas, 1982)
With Michael Carvin
Revelation (Muse, 1991)
Each One Teach One (Muse, 1994)
With Cyrus Chestnut
A Million Colors in Your Mind (HighNote, 2015)
With Freddy Cole
Love Makes the Changes (Fantasy, 1998)
With Charles Davis
Ingia! (Strata-East, 1974)
With Roberta Flack
Children of The Night (Atlantic, 1970)
With Sonny Fortune
Monk's Mood (Kennox, 1993)
With Steve Grossman
Love is The Thing	(Red, 1986)
A Small Hotel (Dreyfus Jazz, 1993)
With Slide Hampton
Roots (Criss Cross, 1985)
With Louis Hayes
Breath of Life (Muse, 1974)
With David Hazeltine
Modern Standards (Sharp Nine, 2005)
With Billy Higgins
Billy Higgins Quintet (Sweet Basil, 1993)
With Terumasa Hino
Blue Smiles (Something Else, 1992)
With Freddie Hubbard
Bolivia (Music Masters, 1991)
With Abdullah Ibrahim
 Mindif (Enja, 1988)
 Water From an Ancient Well (Black Ha, 1988)
With Jermaine Jackson
Jermaine (Motown, 1980)
With Elvin Jones
The Main Force (Vanguard, 1974)
New Agenda (Vanguard, 1975)
With Sam Jones
 Cello Again (Xanadu, 1975)
With Clifford Jordan
Down Through the Years (Milestone, 1991)
With Duke Jordan
Murray Hill Caper (Spotlite, 1973)
With Joyce
Language and Love (Polygram, 1991)
With David Lasley
Missin' Twenty Grand (EMI, 1982)
With Liberace
My Friends Call Me Lee (AVI, 1978)
With Warne Marsh
Back Home (Criss Cross Jazz, 1986)
With Jackie McLean
Nature Boy (Something Else, 1999)
With Charles McPherson
But Beautiful (Venus, 2003)
With James Moody, Clark Terry and Elvin Jones
Summit Meeting (Vanguard, 1977)
With Frank Morgan
A Lovesome Thing (Antilles, 1991)
With David "Fathead" Newman
Heads Up (Atlantic, 1987)
Fire! Live at the Village Vanguard (Atlantic, 1989)
Davey Blue (HighNote, 2002)
With One for All
Killer Joe (Venus Records, 2005)
With Art Pepper
The Trip (Contemporary, 1976)
Art Pepper with Duke Jordan in Copenhagen 1981 (Galaxy, 1981 [1996]) with Duke Jordan 
Roadgame (Galaxy, 1981 [1982])
Art Lives (Galaxy 1981 [1983])
APQ (Galaxy, 1981 [1984])
Arthur's Blues (Galaxy, 1981 [1991])
Unreleased Art, Vol. 1:The Complete Abashiri Concert - November 22, 1981 (Widows Taste, 1981 [2006])
Final Art: Art Pepper Last Concert 1982 (Tofrec, 1982 [1991])
With Dave Pike
Pike's Groove (Criss Cross Jazz, 1986) with Cedar Walton
With Ernest Ranglin
Memories of Barber Mack (Island, 1997)
With Vanessa Rubin
Girl Talk (Telarc, 1999)
With Janis Siegel
I Wish You Love (Telarc, 2002)
With the Voices of East Harlem
Live (Just Sun, 1973)
Can You Feel It (1974)
With Cedar Walton
 The Maestro (Muse, 1981)
 Eastern Rebellion 4 (Timeless, 1984)
 Cedar's Blues (Red, 1985)
 The Trio 1 (Red, 1985)
 The Trio 2 (Red, 1985)
 The Trio 3 (Red, 1985)
Cedar Walton (Timeless, 1985)
 Bluesville Time (Criss Cross, 1985)
As Long as There's Music (Muse, 1990 [1993])
Mosaic (Music Masters, 1990 [1992]) as Eastern Rebellion
Simple Pleasure (Music Masters, 1993) as Eastern Rebellion
You're My Everything (Sweet Basil, 1993)
Art Blakey Legacy (Sweet Basil, 1993)
Live at the Village Vanguard (Music Masters, 1994) - as Eastern Rebellion
Never Let Me Go (Sweet Basil, 1994)
Manhattan Afternoon (Criss Cross, 1994)
Sweet Basil Trio (Sweet Basil, 1995)
Iron Clad (Monarch, 1995)
The Promise Land (HighNote, 2001)
Midnight Waltz (Venus, 2005)
One Flight Down (HighNote, 2006)
 The Bouncer (HighNote, 2011)
With Larry Willis
How Do You Keep the Music Playing? (SteepleChase, 1992)
A Tribute to Someone (AudioQuest, 1994)

References

External links

 
 Chantal Esdelle, "Hanging With Happy", May 29, 2010.
 Ethan Iverson, "Interview with David Williams (for Cedar Walton)", Do the Math, November 11, 2013.

Trinidad and Tobago musicians
Jazz double-bassists
Living people
Trinidad and Tobago emigrants to the United States
20th-century jazz composers
1946 births
21st-century double-bassists